Axa Investment Managers (Axa IM) is a global investment management firm with offices in over 22 locations worldwide. As of 31 December 2021, it manages over €887 billion in assets on behalf of institutional and retail clients. It operates as the investment arm for Axa, a global insurance and reinsurance company.

History 

In 1994, Axa created an investment management subsidiary under the name, Axa Asset Management.  It operated separately from the insurance business lines and was headed by Jean-Pierre Hellebuyck.

In 1997, Henri de Castries launched AXA Investment Managers (Axa IM) which Axa Asset Management became a part of. Donald Brydon was selected to be its chief executive officer.

In 1996, Dominique Senequier joined Axa and founded the Axa Private Equity platform. It operated under Axa IM until 2013 where it was spun off as a separate firm and renamed Ardian.

During 1999, Axa IM paid US$125 million for a controlling stake in the Rosenberg Group, an active quantitative global equity manager based in California. It was renamed to "Rosenberg Equities" which now operates as the quantitative investment platform under Axa IM. In the same year, AXA Real Estate Investment Managers was also established. It was eventually renamed to the "Real Assets" platform.

In 2002, Axa IM set up its Structure Finance division.

In 2005, Axa IM purchased the investment firm, Framlington Group from HSBC Holdings and Comerica for US$342.5 million. It was renamed to "Framlington Equities" which now operates as a long term equity active management platform under Axa IM.

In 2006, Axa IM established a joint venture with Shanghai Pudong Development Bank. The resulting joint venture was AXA SPDB Investment Managers Co., Ltd, which is based in China.

In 2008, Axa IM set up a joint venture with Kyobo Life Insurance Company. The resulting joint venture was Kyobo AXA Investment Managers, which is based in South Korea.

In 2012, Axa IM established two joint ventures with Bank of India. They were BOI AXA Investment Managers Private Limited and BOI AXA Trustee Services Private Limited, which are based in India.

In 2015, the Real Assets division launched Baytree Logistics Properties, a pan-European logistics and industrial development platform.

During 2016, Axa IM set up Chorus, a hedge fund platform. In the same year, the Real Assets division acquired Sydney-based, Eureka Funds Management to expand its real assets' operation in the Asia-Pacific region.

Business overview 

Axa IM has seven different investment platforms. They are:

 Framlington Equities (Active investment management)
 Rosenberg Equities (Quantitative investment management)
 Fixed Income
 Real Assets (Real Estate and Infrastructure investments)
 Multi-Asset
 Structured Finance
 Chorus (Hedge Fund)
At the end of March 2020, of Axa IM’s AUM, around 40% was in Fixed Income, 29% Multi-Asset, 8% in Structured Finance, 12% in Real Assets and 7% in Equities.

During 2020, Axa IM restructured its organization to create two main business units, Axa IM Alts and Axa IM Core.

Axa IM Alts consists of the Real Assets, Structured Finance and Chorus investment platforms. At the end of 2020, it had €159 billion assets under management.

Axa IM Core consists of the Framlington Equities, Rosenberg Equities, Fixed Income and Multi-Asset investment platforms. At the end of 2020, it had €559 billion assets under management.

Axa IM has offices in 22 different country which cover Europe, Asia and North America.

References

External links

Axa
Investment management companies of France
Financial services companies established in 1997